East Resources, Inc., was an oil and gas exploration and production company with a focus on unconventional shale oil and gas resources in the United States.

History
The company was founded in 1983 by Terrence Pegula. Based in Cattaraugus County, New York through much of the late 20th century the company specialized in oil. In 2008, the company began focusing on natural gas through hydraulic fracturing. It profited heavily upon discovery of deep layers of natural gas in the Marcellus Formation and  development of the hydraulic fracturing ("fracking") recovery process. At the height of the company it was based in Parkersburg, West Virginia with additional offices in Warrendale, Pennsylvania, Allegany, New York, and Denver, Colorado, with natural gas processing facilities in Northern Pennsylvania.

East Resources sold most of its assets to Royal Dutch Shell in 2010 for $4.7 billion and the rest to American Energy Partners, LP in 2014 for $1.75 billion.

Pegula has shifted his focus to sports and entertainment properties, acquiring the Buffalo Sabres in 2011  and the Buffalo Bills in 2014.

Today
Pegula continues to own some natural gas assets through other companies, including Greater Rocky Mountain Regional Oil & Gas in Colorado and Wyoming, and JKLM Energy (named after the initials of Pegula's children) in Pennsylvania. The remains of the company are based in Boca Raton, Florida.

See also
 Pegula Sports and Entertainment – sports and entertainment company formed from Pegula's sale of East Resources

References

Oil companies of the United States
Companies established in 1983
Companies based in Cattaraugus County, New York
Companies based in Boca Raton, Florida